The Equestrian statue of Frederick the Great on Unter den Linden avenue in Berlin's Mitte district commemorates King Frederick II. of Prussia. Created from 1839 to 1851 by Christian Daniel Rauch, it is a masterpiece of the Berlin school of sculpture, marking the transition from neoclassicism to realism. The bronze statue shows "The Old Fritz" dressed in military uniform, ermine coat and tricorne hat on horseback above the leading generals, statesmen, artists and scientist of his time. Walled in during World War II, it was disassembled by East Germany in 1950, reassembled in Sanssouci Park in 1963, and returned to its original location in 1980.

History
Prussian King Frederick William III commissioned the monument from sculptor Christian Daniel Rauch in 1839. It was cast beginning in 1845 by Karl Ludwig Friebel, whom Rauch brought from Lauchhammer for the purpose; changes to the figures on the base extended work to six years, and the monument was unveiled on 31 May 1851. It is one of Rauch's best known works, and influenced other monuments erected in the late 19th and early 20th centuries. 

The equestrian statue influenced many other monuments and is a registered monument of the City of Berlin. Beneath the equestrian statue itself, the unusually large plinth includes reliefs of the four cardinal virtues and important scenes from Frederick's life, and depictions, many in full relief, of 74 notable men from his reign; bronze plaques beneath the bands of sculpture list military men, philosophers, mathematicians, poets, statesmen, engineers, and others important in Prussia's emergence as a great power in the mid-18th century.

During World War II, the monument was encased in concrete for protection. In May 1950, the East German Magistrat decided to remove it to the park at the palace of Sanssouci in Potsdam. Metal thieves damaged it after the protective casing was removed, and it was dismantled and taken away between 13 and 19 July. After being stored in pieces and at one point almost melted down, by 1962 the monument had been re-erected in the hippodrome at Charlottenhof Palace.

In the 1980s, the East German government changed its politics of memory and especially its position on the Prussian heritage. In 1980 Erich Honecker called Frederick "the Great" in an interview with Robert Maxwell; in the same year, the historian  published a relatively positive biography of the king. West Germany saw a similar return of a more positive view on Prussia with the Berlin exhibition Preußen – Versuch einer Bilanz (Prussia, an attempt at a complete picture). The preparations to celebrate the 750th anniversary of the founding of Berlin in 1987 led to further reconsideration of the Prussian heritage; that year Gisela May performed a song celebrating the statue's return.

After German reunification, the Senate of Berlin had the monument scientifically restored, and it was replaced in its original position, with the wrought-iron fence and 19th-century lamp posts recreated. After having paint thrown at it during a protest against the Bundeswehr, it was restored once more in 2006 and given a coating of wax to protect against graffiti.

Description and location

It depicts Frederick in military uniform and an ermine-trimmed cloak, wearing his decorations, and with his characteristic bicorne hat; he holds the reins in his left hand and in his right has a walking stick.

The statue stands at the east end of Unter den Linden, facing east at the west end of the former Forum Fridericianum (now Bebelplatz) towards the site of the royal palace. It is enclosed by a low wrought-iron fence, which was recreated when the monument was restored and replaced in its original position.

Upper band
The upper sculpted band, immediately below the statue of the king, shows in bas-relief scenes from his life and is garnished at the corners with emblems of the four cardinal virtues in full relief.

Middle band
The middle band depicts 74 men of Frederick the Great's time in life-size; some, such as the figure of his brother August, are free-standing; others are depicted in high relief. A few, including James Keith, are in bas-relief. As with the upper band, four figures in full relief stand at the corners, this time on horseback: Frederick's brother, Prince Henry of Prussia; Charles William Ferdinand, Duke of Brunswick-Wolfenbüttel; Friedrich Wilhelm von Seydlitz; and Hans Joachim von Zieten.

Between the mounted figures stand 25 of the key men of Frederick's career. Some of them are full-sized free-standing figures and several are carved in partial relief. The figures represented are predominantly military, but also include civilians of note, including diplomats, the Prime Minister of Prussia, jurists, poets, artists, and philosophers.

Lower band
The lowest band lists names of additional key figures from Frederick's reign, pressed in bronze.

South face
The south face displays bronze plaques with the names of 25 generals.

North face
The north face contains the names of 32 key military figures in Frederick's life.  Thirty-two are generals; three are men who contributed significantly to various battles but because of early deaths did not reach the highest military rank.

West face
The west face includes 14 men who contributed to the Prussian state as diplomats, authors, jurists, architects, painters and poets.

East face

The east face bears the names of Frederick the Great, Frederick William III, and Frederick William IV, along with the dates on which the monument was commissioned and completed.

Other statues of Frederick the Great
Johann Gottfried Schadow, who was Rauch's teacher and had received many commissions under the previous king, Frederick William II, had expected to carry out this commission. He had already in 1821–22 made a lifesize bronze of Frederick the Great with two greyhounds, which is at Sanssouci. He also created a marble statue of Frederick for the city of Stettin, now lost, a bronze reproduction of which is now in the grounds outside the New Wing at Charlottenburg Palace.

In 1865 two students of Rauch's, Aloisio Lazzerini and Carlo Baratta, made an approximately half-size copy in marble of Rauch's equestrian statue, which is in the park at Sanssouci.

Another smaller copy of Rauch's statue was made to commemorate Frederick's overnight stay in the Dehlitz section of Lützen before the Battle of Rossbach in 1757, and stood in a park there from 1858 until World War II, when it was moved for safekeeping to  Lützen Castle.

See also

 List of equestrian statues in Germany

References

Further information
 Jutta von Simson. Das Berliner Denkmal für Friedrich den Großen. Die Entwürfe als Spiegelung des preußischen Selbstverständnisses. Frankfurt/Berlin: Ullstein/Propyläen, 1976,  
 
 Frank Pieter Hesse and Gesine Sturm (ed.). Ein Denkmal für den König. Das Reiterstandbild für Friedrich II. Unter den Linden in Berlin. Beiträge zur Denkmalpflege in Berlin 17. Berlin: Schelzky & Jeep, 2001,  (German/English picture book)
 Wieland Giebel (ed.). Das Reiterdenkmal Friedrichs des Großen. Berlin: Story, 2007,  
 Majestät reiten wieder , video on restoration completed in 2001, Mefisto Video GmbH (Windows Media Player) 

Bronze sculptures in Germany
Cultural depictions of Frederick the Great
Equestrian statues in Germany
Statues in Berlin
Sculptures of men in Germany
Statues of monarchs
Mitte
Frederick the Great
Prussian Army personnel